Luis Benjamín Cordero y Crespo (6 April 1833 – 30 January 1912) was President of Ecuador 1 July 1892 to 16 April 1895. 

Cordero was born 6 April 1833 in the Cañar province of Ecuador to parents Gregorio Cordero and Josefa Crespo. Cordero studied at the Seminary High School in Cuenca, and later the Central University of Ecuador in Quito. In 1865 he became a lawyer, arguing cases before the Supreme Court of Cuenca. After his career in law, Cordero began publishing poetry and in 1892 published the first Quicha-Spanish dictionary.

Political career
Luis Cordero was also a politician, serving as a member of the Progresistas, a liberal Catholic political party, and was a member of the provisional governing junta which led the Progresistas to power in 1883. He was President of the Senate in 1885. 

In 1892 Cordero became president of Ecuador. Despite being a popular leader, Luis Cordero was forced to leave office following an international political scandal known as La venta de la bandera, or the sale of the flag. During the First Sino-Japanese war, the Ecuadorian ambassador to Chile sold weapons to Japan on behalf of Chilean businessmen, despite Chile's declared neutrality. The shipment was detained while sporting the Ecuadorian flag to cover for Chile's involvement, so the public blamed Cordero who, after a short armed conflict, was forced to resign. Former president and then-Governor of Guayas province, José María Plácido Caamaño, was discovered to be involved in the affair, so he was forced into exile where he died. In 1898 the Ecuadorian Supreme Court dropped all charges against Cordero after the Ecuadorian ambassador's involvement came to light.

Luis Cordero wrote poems in Spanish and Kichwa and published the first Kichwa-Spanish-Kichwa dictionary in Ecuador in 1892.

Works
Dos cantos a la Raza Latina
Elogio de Malo y Solano
Poesías Jocosas
Poesías Serias
El Rimini llacta y el Cuchiquillca
El Adios
Luis Cordero (1892): Quichua Shimiyuc Panca: Quichua-Castilla, Castilla-Quichua = Diccionario Quichua Quichua-Castellano, Castellano-Quichua. Coleccion Kashcanchicracmi, 1, 427 pankakuna, 4th edition, January 1989,

External links

 Official Website of the Ecuadorian Government about the country President's History
¡Rinimi, Llacta! – Poems of Luis Cordero Crespo in Quichua, with Spanish translation

1833 births
1912 deaths
19th-century Ecuadorian poets
Presidents of Ecuador
Presidents of the Senate of Ecuador
Ecuadorian male poets